Ronald Edmund Foster (22 November 1938 – 28 July 2017) was an English professional footballer who played as an inside forward. Active in both England and the United States between 1959 and 1969, Foster made over 250 career appearances for five teams.

Career
Born in Islington, Foster played non-League football with Clapton before turning professional in 1959 with Leyton Orient. Foster also played in the Football League for Grimsby Town, Reading and Brentford, as well as in the North American Soccer League with the Dallas Tornado, before retiring in 1969.

References

External links

NASL career stats

1938 births
2017 deaths
Footballers from Islington (district)
English footballers
Association football inside forwards
Clapton F.C. players
Leyton Orient F.C. players
Grimsby Town F.C. players
Reading F.C. players
Dallas Tornado players
Brentford F.C. players
English Football League players
North American Soccer League (1968–1984) players
English expatriate sportspeople in the United States
Expatriate soccer players in the United States
English expatriate footballers